Desmella conyzae is a species of tephritid or fruit flies in the genus Desmella of the family Tephritidae.

Distribution
Egypt.

References

Tephritinae
Insects described in 1857
Taxa named by Georg Ritter von Frauenfeld
Diptera of Africa